Clinton Dickson Chandler (4 April 1910 – 6 June 1969) was an Australian rules footballer who played with Carlton and Hawthorn in the Victorian Football League (VFL).

Notes

External links 

Dick Chandler's profile at Blueseum

1910 births
1969 deaths
Carlton Football Club players
Hawthorn Football Club players
Australian rules footballers from Victoria (Australia)